Pérols is a commune in the Hérault department in the Occitanie region in southern France. Close to the city of Montpellier, it is mostly a quiet village with beautiful old buildings.

Population

See also
Communes of the Hérault department

References

Communes of Hérault